Roderick James McNair (25 November 1870 – 18 November 1944) was a British amateur tennis player who competed at the turn of the 20th century.

He married Winifred Margaret Slocock on 22 April 1908.

Tennis career
McNair reached the quarter-finals of Wimbledon in 1900, 1901 and 1904. He also regularly competed at Queens, reaching the semifinals in 1899 and 1907.

References

External links

1870 births
1944 deaths
English male tennis players
Tennis people from Greater London
British male tennis players